Hectopsyllidae is a small family of fleas, containing only the chigoe flea Tunga penetrans and the genus Hectopsylla. They were formerly known as Tungidae, and by authorities that demote the Pulicoidea to family rank they are treated as subfamily Hectopsyllinae (formerly Tunginae). Only 2 genera with some handfuls of species are placed here nowadays, making further subdivision of the family unnecessary.

These fleas usually parasitize terrestrial mammals, and in a few cases birds and bats. The females are by and large immobile and will remain attached to the same place for prolonged periods of time, possibly until they die. Hectopsylla narium was found to live inside the nostrils of the burrowing parrot (Cyanoliseus patagonus patagonus).

The closest living relatives of the Hectopsyllidae are the common fleas, Pulicidae. The Hectopsyllidae differ from these by the following characteristics:
 Antennal club with punctiform sensilla
 dorsal and medial setae on the abdominal terga of the female reduced
 Left and right sensilia separated midways and with 8 sensory pits
 Proximal arm of ninth sternite lobe-shaped
 Well-sclerotized and crisply outlined lateral lamina of the aedeagal apodeme

In addition, they have reduced setae on the antennal flagellum, but this may be an adaptation bearing little phylogenetic information.

References

Fleas
Insects of South America
Insect families